13AD was a prominent classic and hard rock band from Kochi, India.

History and formation 
13AD was one of India's topmost rock bands from the 1980s to the mid-1990s. The band was formed in 1977. The line up at that time was Stanley Luiz on vocals, Eloy Isaacs on guitar and vocals, Ashley Pinto on guitars and vocals, Anil Raun on bass guitar, and Petro Correia on drums. 13AD used to play in hotel Sea Lord in Kochi, Kerala, India. 

They released two albums, Ground Zero and Tough on the Streets in the 1990s. George Thomas Jr. (Viju), who used to jam with the band, urged them to write their own songs. Thomas wrote the songs "Ground Zero" and "Revelations".  The song "Ground Zero" from the album Ground Zero was a hit during the 1990s.

With the release of their debut album Ground Zero (1989), the band grabbed the attention of young India. After relentless travelling, the band brought out another album Tough on the Streets (1992). 

In 1993, they got the opportunity to perform overseas at a few high-end restaurants in Muscat, Oman. They played at Pavo Real, a Mexican Restaurant, where the band gained further fame and popularity among fans in the Middle East. This line up included George Peter, Pinson Correia and lady crooner Sunita Menon.

Band members

George Peter - vocals
Eloy Isaacs - lead and rhythm guitars
Jackson Aruja - keyboards
Pinson Correia - drums
Paul K J - bass

Former members
Stanly Luiz – vocals
Glen La Rive – vocals
Nadine Gregory - vocals
Rose – vocals
Sarina – vocals
Sunita Menon – vocals
Ashley Pinto – guitar, vocals
Anil Raun – bass guitar
Petro Correia – drums

Discography

1990 – Ground Zero
1993 – Tough on the Streets

Reunion and recent happenings 
After a break, the band had announced a reunion in 2008. During the reunion concert, they announced the release of their third album City Blues.

13AD plan to bring forth a new bilingual album.

In popular media 
A reference to the band is shown as a wall art in the Malayalam movie Bheeshma Parvam during the song 'Parudeesa'

References

External links

https://web.archive.org/web/20100130222536/http://planetradiocity.com/musicopedia/music_band.php?conid=125&Genre=13AD

Indian rock music groups
Musical groups established in 1980